A charitable trust is an irrevocable trust established for charitable purposes and, in some jurisdictions, a more specific term than "charitable organization". A charitable trust enjoys a varying degree of tax benefits in most countries. It also generates good will. Some important terminology in charitable trusts is the term "corpus" (Latin for "body"), which refers to the assets with which the trust is funded, and the term "donor", which is the person donating assets to a charity.

India
In India, trusts set up for the social causes and  approved by the Income Tax Department get not only exemption from payment of tax but also the donors to such trusts can deduct the amount of donation to the trust from their taxable income. The legal framework in India recognizes activities including "relief of the poor, education, medical relief, preserving monuments and environment, and the advancement of any other object of general public utility" as charitable purposes. Companies formed under Section 8 of the Companies Act, 2013 for promoting charity also receive benefits under law including exemption from various procedural provisions of the Companies Act, either fully or in part, and are also entitled to such other exemptions that the Central Government may accord through its orders.

Iran
In the Islamic Republic of Iran religious charitable trusts, or bonyads, make up a substantial part of the country's economy, controlling an estimated 20% of Iran's GDP. Unlike some other Muslim-majority countries, the bonyads receive large and controversial subsidies from the Iranian government.

United Kingdom

In England and Wales, charitable trusts are a form of express trust dedicated to charitable goals. There are a variety of advantages to charitable trust status, including exemption from most forms of tax and freedom for the trustees not found in other types of English trust. To be a valid charitable trust, the organisation must demonstrate both a charitable purpose and a public benefit. Applicable charitable purposes are normally divided into four categories; trusts for the relief of poverty, trusts for the promotion of education, trusts for the promotion of religion, and all other types of trust recognised by the law, which includes trusts for the benefit of animals and trusts for the benefit of a locality. There is also a requirement that the trust's purposes benefit the public (or some section of the public), and not simply a group of private individuals.

Such trusts will be invalid in several circumstances; charitable trusts are not allowed to be run for profit, nor can they have purposes that are not charitable (unless these are ancillary to the charitable purpose). In addition, it is considered unacceptable for charitable trusts to campaign for political or legal change, although discussing political issues in a neutral manner is acceptable. Charitable trusts, as with other trusts, are administered by trustees, but there is no relationship between the trustees and the beneficiaries. This results in two things; first, the trustees of a charitable trust are far freer to act than other trustees; and, secondly, beneficiaries cannot bring a court case against the trustees. Rather, the beneficiaries are represented by the Attorney General for England and Wales as a parens patriae, who appears on the part of The Crown.

Jurisdiction over charitable disputes is shared equally between the High Court of Justice and the Charity Commission. The Commission, the first port of call, is tasked with regulating and promoting charitable trusts, as well as providing advice and opinions to trustees on administrative matters. Where the Commission feels there has been mismanagement or maladministration, it can sanction the trustees, removing them, appointing new ones or temporarily taking the trust property itself to prevent harm being done. Where there are flaws with a charity, the High Court can administer schemes directing the function of the charity.

United States
In the United States, many individuals use charitable trusts to leave all or a portion of their estate to charity when they die, both for philanthropic purposes and for certain tax benefits. Charitable trusts may be set up inter vivos (during a donor's life) or as a part of a trust or will at death (testamentary). There are two basic types of US charitable trusts: charitable remainder trusts (CRT) and charitable lead trusts (CLT). There also is an Optimized Charitable Lead Annuity Trust (OCLAT) that was designed to maximize the tax and economic benefits to the contributor.

Charitable remainder trusts are irrevocable structures established by a donor to provide an income stream to the income beneficiary, while the public charity or private foundation receives the remainder value when the trust terminates. These "split interest" trusts are defined in §664 of the Internal Revenue Code and are normally tax-exempt. A section 664 trust makes its payments, either of a fixed amount (charitable remainder annuity trust) or a percentage of trust principal (charitable remainder unitrust), to either the donor or another named beneficiary. If the trust qualifies under IRS code, the donor may claim a charitable income tax deduction for their donation to the trust. Additionally, the donor may not have to pay an immediate capital gains tax when the trust disposes of the appreciated asset and purchases other income-generating assets to fund the trust. At the end of the trust term, which may be based on either lives or a term of years, the charity receives whatever amount is left in the trust. Charitable remainder unitrusts provide some flexibility in the distribution of income, and may be helpful in retirement planning, while charitable remainder annuity trusts paying a fixed dollar amount are more rigid and usually appeal to much older donors unconcerned about inflation's impact on income distributions who are using cash or marketable securities to fund the trust.

Charitable lead trusts are the opposite of charitable remainder trusts and first make payments to charity for the term of the trust. As with charitable remainder trust, payments may be either of a fixed amount (charitable lead annuity trust) or a percentage of trust principal (charitable lead unitrust). At the end of the trust term, the remainder can either go back to the donor or to heirs named by the donor. The donor may sometimes claim a charitable income tax deduction or a gift/estate tax deduction for making a lead trust gift, depending on the type of a charitable lead trust. Generally, a non-grantor lead trust does not generate a current income tax deduction, but it eliminates the asset (or part of the asset's value) from the donor's estate.

See also
Charitable organization
Coproduction of public services by service users and communities
Foundation (nonprofit organization)
Waqf

References

Sources

Wills and trusts
Types of organization
Charity law